Omnipotent Government: The Rise of the Total State and Total War is a book by Austrian School economist Ludwig von Mises first published in 1944 by Yale University Press. It is one of the most influential writings in Libertarian social thought and critique of statist ideology and socialism, examining the rise of Nazism as an example. The book treats Nazism as a species of orthodox socialist theory.  At the same time the book offers a critique of economic interventionism, industrial central planning, the welfare state, and world government, denouncing the trends of the Western Allies towards the total state. The book was made available online by the Ludwig von Mises Institute in 2004.

Publication history
 Ludwig von Mises, Omnipotent Government: The Rise of the Total State and Total War. New Haven: Yale University Press, 1944.
 Ludwig von Mises, Omnipotent Government: The Rise of the Total State and Total War. New Rochelle, NY: Arlington House, 1969. .
 Ludwig von Mises, Omnipotent Government: The Rise of the Total State and Total War. Spring Mills, PA: Libertarian Press, 1985. .

Reviews
 Basch, Antonin (1944). Review of Ludwig von Mises, Omnipotent Government. The American Economic Review 34.4, 899–903.
 Coker, Francis W. (1944). Review of Ludwig von Mises, Omnipotent Government; The Rise of the Total State and Total War. The American Political Science Review 38.5, 1003–1005.
 Passant, E. J. (1944). Review of Ludwig von Mises, Omnipotent Government, and Norman Angell, Let the People Know. The Economic Journal 54.215/216, 384–387.
 Simons, Henry C.  (1944). Review of Ludwig von Mises, Omnipotent Government: The Rise of the Total State and Total War. Annals of the American Academy of Political and Social Science 236, Adolescents in Wartime, pp. 192–193
 Yoder, Fred R. (1944). Review of Ludwig von Mises, The Omnipotent State (sic). American Sociological Review 10:2 (1944), p. 326
 Baster, A. S. J. (1945). Review of Ludwig von Mises, Omnipotent Government. Economica, New Series 12.45, 39–40.
 Hexner, Ervin (1945). Review of Ludwig von Mises, Omnipotent Government. The Rise of the Total State and Total War. Social Forces 23.4, 466–467.
 Kohn, Hans (1945). Review of Ludwig von Mises, Omnipotent Government: The Rise of the Total State and Total War. The American Historical Review 50.3, 531–533.
 Robson, Charles B. (1945). Review of Ludwig von Mises, Omnipotent Government; The Rise of the Total State and Total War. The Journal of Politics 7.1, 98–100.
 Hula, Erich. (1945). Review of Ludwig von Mises, Omnipotent Government. The Rise of the Total State and Total War. Social Research 12:4 (November 1945), pp. 509–511
 Peardon, T. P. (1945). Review of Ludwig von Mises, Omnipotent Government: The Rise of the Total State and Total War. Political Science Quarterly 60:1 (March 1945), pp. 130–131
 Minshall, T. H. (1947). Review of Ludwig von Mises, Omnipotent Government. The Rise of the Total State and Total War. International Affairs (Royal Institute of International Affairs 1944–) 23.2, 240–241.
 Hessen, Robert (1970). Review of Ludwig von Mises, Omnipotent Government. The Objectivist 9.8.
 Rothbard, Murray N. (1975). Reviews of Ludwig von Mises, Omnipotent Government and Theory and History. Libertarian Review, June 1975, p. 1.

Translations
  Ludwig von Mises, Omnipotencia Gubernamental. Translated by Pedro Elgoibar. Mexico: Editorial Hermes, n.d.
  Ludwig von Mises, Le Gouvernement Omnipotent de L`État Totalitaire à la Guerre Total. Translated by M. de Hulster. Paris: Librairie de Médicis, 1947.
  Ludwig von Mises, Im Namen des Staates, oder Die Gefahren des Kollektivismus [In the Name of the State: or the Dangers of Collectivism]. Stuttgart: Bonn Aktuell, 1978. 
  Людвиг фон Мизес, Всемогущее правительство: Тотальное государство и тотальная война. Moscow: Социум, 2006. .

See also

 The Road to Serfdom

References

External links

Full text
 Omnipotent Government, 1944 edition:
 Full text in HTML
 Full text in PDF
 Full text in EPUB

1944 non-fiction books
Books by Ludwig von Mises
Books about economic history
Books about liberalism
Books about Nazism
Books about totalitarianism
Books about capitalism
History books about World War II
Sociology books
Yale University Press books